V4 Kochi is a political organisation cum movement based out of Kochi, Kerala. The organization was formed prior to the 2020 Kerala local elections to contest in Kochi Municipal Corporation. The stated objective of the organization was to ensure good governance through curbing corruption and implementing people-centric policies. The chief campaign controller of the movement was Nipun Cherian, an engineering professional. The organisation was composed of people who were previously associated with other independent movements like Aam Aadmi Party and Swaraj Abhiyan in the city.

Electoral politics 
In the Kerala local elections held in November 2020, the outfit contested in 59 divisions of Kochi Municipal Corporation garnering more than 20,000 votes and getting a 10.2 percent vote share. In three divisions namely Palarivattom, Nasrathu and Ayyappankavu V4 Kochi came second and in ten divisions they came to the third spot.  In many places their total number of votes exceeded the victory margin of leading candidates and thereby changed the poll dynamics.

The party fielded three candidates in Ernakulam, Thrikkakara, and Kochi assembly constituencies for the 2021 Kerala Legislative Assembly election registering less than 2% vote share in all the three places.

Activism 
The members of V4 Kochi were involved in protests associated with delay in inaugurating the flyover at Vyttila and few members were arrested in connection with skirmish that occurred on 5 January 2021 following unauthorized informal opening of the flyover.

See also 

 Twenty20 Kizhakkambalam
Thiruvananthapuram Vikasana Munnettam

References 

Suburbs of Kochi
2020 establishments in Kerala
Organizations established in 2020
Political parties in Kerala